Coras Fútbol Club commonly known as Coras de Tepic is a football club that plays in the Mexican football league system Mexican Liga Premier (third-tier). The club was founded in the late 1950s as Deportivo Tepic and is based in Tepic, Nayarit, Mexico.

History
The club was founded on July 19, 1959 by Francisco Mengibar Bueno and quickly joined the Segunda División de México. The club played mostly in the Mexican inferior division from 1960 to the 1980s. In 1986 the club was invited to play the Copa de Oro de Occidente with first and second division clubs based in the mid-western region of the country.

In 1994 the club was invited to play the first tournament in the newly created Primera A. The club struggled during its first year and was relegated back to the Segunda División de México after the 1995–96 tournament. In 2002 the club won the Apertura 2002 tournament in Segunda División de México. The club has been playing on and off ever since and recently built a new stadium in order to rejoin the Ascenso MX for the Apertura 2012 tournament. They also played the Austin Posse in 2004.

In June 2017, owner Jose Luis Higuera confirmed the club would no longer exist after he bought a new club, Club Atlético Zacatepec. Coras disappeared for a month. 

In July 2017, the Cuervos de Ensenada club management announced its move to Tepic, where it was renamed as Deportivo Tepic JAP. However, this new team was highlighted by poor economic and administrative management that led to its disappearance in May 2018.

Before the start of the 2018-19 season, it was announced the founding of a new team called Coras de Nayarit F.C., the new club arose from the purchase of the Acatlán F.C. license, team that was champion of the Third Division in 2017-18 season, which could not promote by not meeting the requirements of Serie A. Coras de Nayarit was a team made up of local businessmen and the state government. In June 2020 this team was put on hiatus due to financial problems derived from COVID-19, so it did not participate in the 2020-21 season. 

In July 2021 the team was resumed to continue participating in Serie A, however, due to changes in the administration the club was renamed as Coras F.C.

Stadium

Since 2021 Coras Fútbol Club play their home matches at the Estadio Olímpico Santa Teresita in Tepic, Nayarit. The stadium capacity is 4,000 people. It is owned by the state of Nayarit, and its surface is covered by natural grass. The stadium was opened in 2014.

Alternatively, the team also plays some matches in the Estadio Nicolás Álvarez Ortega in Tepic, Nayarit. The stadium capacity is 12,271 people. It is also owned by Nayarit, and its surface is covered by natural grass. The stadium was opened in 2011. It was the club's main stadium until 2020, however, in 2021 it was decided to stop using this field because it is far from the urban area of Tepic.

Players

Current squad

Reserve teams
Coras F.C. (Liga TDP)
Reserve team that plays in the Liga TDP, the fourth level of the Mexican league system.

Managers 
  Ramón Morales (2016)
  Marcelo Michel Leaño (2017)
  Manuel Naya Barba (2018–2020)
  Marco Antonio Díaz (2020–2021)
  Omar Ávila (2021–2022)
  Manuel Naya Barba (2022)
  José Rizo (2023–)

Season to season

 Has Played 60 2nd Division Tournaments last in April 2018.
 Has Played 8 3rd Division Tournaments last in 2009.
 Has Played 8 Ascenso MX Tournaments last in Clausura 2017.
 Has Played 0 Mexican Primera División Tournaments in history.
After the 1971–72 tournament the club played under the name Club Universidad de Nayarit till the 1975–76 .
 After the Clausura 2006 the club was sold to Chivas and was renamed Chivas Coras but a Deportivo Tepic club played in the Third Division.
The club left the third division  in 2009 and made a return in the Apertura 2011 in the second division.

Honours
Segunda División de México (1) Apertura 2002
Runner up (1) (1982–83)
Tercera División de México (1) Apertura 2003Copa Mexico de Segunda DivisiónRunner up (1)''' 1961–2020

See also
 Segunda División de México
Primera A
Nayarit
Football in Mexico

Footnotes

External links
Official site of Deportivo Tepic

Football clubs in Nayarit
Association football clubs established in 1959
1959 establishments in Mexico